Omeima Mudawi-Rowlings  (born April 1969) is a British-Sudanese deaf textile artist based in Brighton who is known for services to people with disabilities in the arts.

Early life and education 
Omeima Osman Khalid Mudawi was born in April 1969, in Sudan. She became deaf when she was four years old, after a bout of meningitis, and lived in Khartoum until she was twelve. Then her family decided to leave Sudan, as her brother became deaf too. This was to give them better education and life opportunities than in Khartoum — according to Mudawi-Rowlings — as there were no deaf schools or a deaf community, and teachers didn't understand her disability. However, her father remained in Sudan.

Mudawi-Rowlings graduated from the Surrey Institute of Art & Design, University College in 1998 with a Bachelor of Arts in Textile Design, which provided her with the opportunity to employ natural dyes. Mudawi-Rowlings was lured into the world of textiles by her love of colour, Arabic roots, and the chance to experiment with many procedures. Mudawi-Rowlings described her experience being a deaf student, before the Disability Discrimination Act of 1995, as being tiring and frustrating as support was only being provided during main lectures.

Career 
After her degree, Mudawi-Rowlings struggled to find a job and instead became a development officer at Friends for Young Deaf People. This was followed by numerous employment helping vulnerable and disadvantaged deaf individuals, and a freelancing creative consultancy. In 2003, she founded the Resonant Deaf Women Artist Network.

Mudawi-Rowlings completed a Master of Arts in Arts Policy and Management at Birkbeck, University of London. In 2015, she partnered with Shape Arts and SPACE when she was chosen for a residence in Qatar by the British Council to make work for the Museum of Islamic Art in Doha. Then, in 2017, she was given a research and development grant by Unlimited, a Shape Arts and Artsadmin-led initiative to boost the prominence of disabled artists. The following year, Mudawi-Rowlings received a commission from Artichoke to collaborate with local groups in Brighton to design a banner to commemorate the 100th anniversary of the Suffrage in the United Kingdom. The banner read, "Be Free, Be Visible, Be Counted." She then had her own studio space from Cockpit Arts, which allowed her to start her own studio, Omeima Arts.

Mudawi-Rowlings's dyes, screen printing, and Devoré technique work delves into topics of identity and transformation, communication, heritage, and gender. Her Sudanese ethnicity has a strong effect on her work, and she likes exploring inspirations from Arabic geometry. In addition to her practice, Mudawi-Rowlings works as a mentor and consultant trainer for emerging artists and young people, collaborating with prominent organisations, particularly those interested in inclusive practices

Awards and honours 
Mudawi-Rowlings was the runner-up in the Arab-British CentAward for Culture in 2019. She became a member of the Order of the British Empire (MBE), awarded in the Queen's New Year's Honours list in 2022 for her "services to people with disabilities in the arts." Following Queen Elizabeth II's death, Mudawi-Rowlings received her medal from King Charles III during the February 2023 investiture.

Mudawi-Rowlings is a Clore Fellow, a fellowship that aims to develop leaders from a variety of cultural disciplines and industries. She was chosen as a finalist for the Niamh White-curated Dentons Art Prize.

Personal life 
Mudawi-Rowlings's father is Osman Mudawi, who was one of the founders of the National Congress Party, who ruled Sudan for 30 years until the Sudanese Revolution in 2019. Mudawi-Rowlings comes from a big family of four sisters and five brothers. Her deaf brother, Ahmed Mudawi, is a BSL TV presenter, and Black and deaf awareness trainer.

See also 
 Ahmed Umar (artist)
 Kamala Ibrahim Ishaq

References

External links 
 Interview with Omeima Mudawi-Rowlings, MBE, BBC See Hear on Facebook.
 
 
 'Wheel of Life' experiment with textile printing, moving images and Oud played by musician Rihab Bazar

Sudanese artists
British artists
Living people
Artists with disabilities
Sudanese contemporary artists
British contemporary artists
Members of the Order of the British Empire
1969 births
Birkbeck, University of London
Sudanese diaspora
British people of Sudanese descent
Sudanese women artists